KXXL (106.1 FM) is a radio station licensed to Moorcroft, Wyoming, United States. The station has a Classic rock format, and is currently owned by Keyhole Broadcasting, LLC.

History
The station was assigned the call letters KPKL on 2007-09-07. On 2008-06-11, the station changed its call sign to the current KXXL.

References

External links
KOALRadio Facebook

XXL
Classic rock radio stations in the United States